Steens is an unincorporated community in Lowndes County, Mississippi.  The ZIP Code for Steens is 39766.

According to the United States Geological Survey, a variant name is Jamisons Mill.

The Caledonia Combined Cycle Plant, a Tennessee Valley Authority power plant, is located on 125 acres of land near Steens.

References

Unincorporated communities in Lowndes County, Mississippi
Unincorporated communities in Mississippi